P. Valsala (born 4 April 1938) is a Malayalam novelist, short story writer, and social activist from Kerala, India. She is a recipient of Ezhuthachan Puraskaram 2021, the highest literary honour by government of Kerala. She is only the fifth woman to receive the award since its institution in 1993.

Valsala is also a recipient of Kerala Sahitya Akademi Award for her novel Nizhalurangunna Vazhikal (The Paths where Shadows Sleep). She has written over 25 short story collections and 17 novels. She is renowned for her distinct style of writing.

Her works have won several awards including Kumkumam Award (for Nellu published in 1972), the Kerala Sahitya Akademi Award (for Nizhalurangunna Vazhikal), the Muttathu Varkey Award, and the CV Kunhiraman Memorial Sahitya Award.

A former headmistress, Valsala also held the post of Chairperson of Kerala Sahitya Akademi. She was associated with PuKaSa, a left-leaning cultural movement, but lately she has been supportive of Hindu right-wing organisations. 

She resides in Kozhikode,a district in northern Kerala.

Selected works
Short stories
Pempi, Poorna Books, Calicut, 1969
Pazhaya, Puthiya Nagaram (The Old, New City), The Sahithya Pravarthaka Cooperative Society (SPCS), Kottayam, 1979
Anupamayude Kavalkkaran (The Bodyguard of Anupama), SPCS, 1980
Aanavettakkaran (The Elephant Hunter), SPCS, 1982
Unikkoran Chathopathiya (Unikkoran Chathopathiya), SPCS, 1985
Annamaria Neridan (For Anna Marie To Confront), SPCS, 1988
Karuttha Mazha Peyyunna Thazhvara (The Valley of Black Rains), SPCS, 1988
Chamundy Kuzhi (Chamundi's Pit), SPCS, 1989
Arundhati Karayunnilla (Arundhati doesn't Cry), SPCS, 1991
Koonychoottile Velicham (The Light behind the Flight Stairs), Prabhath Book House, Trivandrum, 1992
Madakkam II (The Return II), D. C. Books, 1998
Panguru Pushpathinde Theen (Honey from the Flower of Panguru), Poorna Books, 1998
Madakkam (The Return), D. C. Books, Kottayam, 1998
Kaly ’98 Thudarcha (Sports 98 Cont.), Prabhath Book House, 1998
Pookku Vayil Ponvayil (The Sunset that is Gold), Olive, 1999
Dhushyanthannum Bheemannummillatha Lokam (The world Devoid by Dhushyntha and Bhima), Poorna Books, 1999
Kalal Kavalal (The Soldier who is the Guard), D. C. Books, 2001
Kottayile Prema (Prema in the forth), Olive Books, Calicut, 2002
Pooram (The Temple Festival), D. C. Books, 2003
Aaranniya Kandam (Stories of the Forest), D. C. Books, 2003
Mythiliyuda Makal (The Daughter of Mythili), Green Books, Calicut, 2004
Ashokanum Ayalum (He and Ashokan), D. C. Books, 2006
Chandalabhikshukiyum Marikkunna Pownamiyum (Chandalabhikshuki and the Dying full Moon), Book Point, Calicut, 2007
Suvarna Kadhakal (The Golden Stories), Green Books, Trichur, 2008
Gate Thurannittirikkunnu, SPCS, Kottayam, 2008

Novel
Thakarcha (Decadence),Poorna Books, Calicut, 1969
Nellu (Paddy), The Sahithya Pravarthaka Cooperative Society (SPCS), Kottayam, 1972 (Adapted into a film with same name in 1974)
Agnayam (Of Fire), SPCS 1974; translated into English by Vasanthi Sankaranarayanan as Agneyam: The story of a Nambudiri woman, Sahitya Akademi, 2008 
Nizhaluragunna Vazhikal (The Paths where Shadaows Sleep), SPCS 1975
Arakkillam (The House of Wax), SPCS, 1977
Venal (The Summer), SPCS, 1979
Kanal (The Live Coal), SPCS, 1979
Nambarukal (The Numbers), SPCS, 1980
Palayam (The Barracks), SPCS, 1981
Kooman Kolly (The Valley Owls), SPCS 1981
Gauthaman (Gauthaman), SPCS, 1986
Aarum marikuunnilla (Nobody Dies), SPCS / D. C. Books, 1987
Chaver (The Knights), SPCS, 1991
Rose merreyude Aakasangal (The Skies of Rosemarry), D. C. Books, Kottayam, 1993
Vilaapam (The Cry), D. C. Books, 1997
Aadhijalam (The Primeval Water), D. C. Books, 2004
Melppalam (The Flyover), Mathrubhumi Books, Calicut, 2007

Awards
Kumkumam Award - Nellu
Kerala Sahithya Academy Award - Nizhalurangunna Vazhikal
Muttathu Varkey Award - for her contributions to Malayalam literature
C. V. Kunhiraman Memorial Sahithya Award
Kerala Sahitya Akademi Fellowship (2019)

References

External links

 
 

1938 births
Living people
Malayalam short story writers
Malayalam novelists
Recipients of the Kerala Sahitya Akademi Award
Indian women novelists
Indian women short story writers
Writers from Kozhikode
Malayalam-language writers
20th-century Indian short story writers
20th-century Indian women writers
20th-century Indian novelists
21st-century Indian short story writers
21st-century Indian novelists
21st-century Indian women writers
21st-century Indian writers
Women writers from Kerala
Novelists from Kerala